In mathematics, especially in differential topology, Thom's first isotopy lemma states: given a smooth map  between smooth manifolds and  a closed Whitney stratified subset, if  is proper and  is a submersion for each stratum  of , then  is a locally trivial fibration. The lemma was originally introduced by René Thom who considered the case when .

The local trivializations that the lemma provide preserve the strata. However, they are generally not smooth (not even ). On the other hand, it is possible that local trivializations are semialgebraic if the input data is semialgebraic.

The lemma is also valid for a more general stratified space such as a stratified space in the sense of Mather but still with the Whitney conditions (or some other conditions). The lemma is also valid for the stratification that satisfies Bekka's condition (C), which is weaker than Whitney's condition (B). (The significance of this is that the consequences of the first isotopy lemma cannot imply Whitney’s condition (B).)

Thom's second isotopy lemma is a family version of the first isotopy lemma.

Proof

The proof is based on the notion of a controlled vector field. (The construction of such a system relies on the Whitney conditions or something weaker.)

Assume the system  is compatible with the map  (such a system exists). Then there are two key results due to Thom:
 Given a vector field  on N, there exists a controlled vector field  on S that is a lift of it: .
 A controlled vector field has a continuous flow (despite the fact that a controlled vector field is discontinuous).

The lemma now follows in a straightforward fashion. Then, by the lifting result, we find controlled vector fields  on  such that . Let  be the flows associated to them. Then define

by

Since the flows  preserve the strata,  also preserves the strata.

See also

Ehresmann's fibration theorem
Thom–Mather stratified space
Tame topology

Note

References

External links

 https://mathoverflow.net/questions/23259/thom-first-isotopy-lemma-in-o-minimal-structures

Differential topology
Lemmas
Stratifications